The Curtis Arboretum is a  arboretum in Wyncote, Pennsylvania. The arboretum was founded by Mary Louise Curtis Bok in honor of her father, Cyrus Curtis.

The landscaping was designed by Frederick Law Olmsted. The arboretum is listed on the National Register of Historic Places.

Description
The arboretum surrounds Curtis Hall, once the ballroom of the Curtis family mansion, which now is operated by the Cheltenham Township Parks and Recreation Department. The arboretum features hills, two ponds, a dog park, a small World War II memorial, and over 50 types of trees.

Curtis Arboretum serves as the home course for the Cheltenham High School men's and women's cross country running teams.

See also 
 List of botanical gardens in the United States

References

External links
Friends of Curtis Arboretum

Parks on the National Register of Historic Places in Pennsylvania
Arboreta in Pennsylvania
Dog parks in the United States
Parks in Montgomery County, Pennsylvania
1937 establishments in Pennsylvania
Cheltenham Township, Pennsylvania
National Register of Historic Places in Montgomery County, Pennsylvania